Jean-Baptiste Veillet-Dufreche is a French politician born on  in Moncontour (Côtes-d'Armor) and died on  at Saint-Brieuc (Côtes-d'Armor).

Biography 
Jean-Baptiste Veillet-Dufreche is the son of Jean-Baptiste Veillet-Dufreche (1802-1874), master of ironworks and mayor of Moncontour, and Victorine Allenou (sister of Jean-Marie Allenou). His brother is Louis Monjaret de Kerjégu's son-in-law, and one of his sisters is Jean Garnier-Bodéléac's wife.

Conservative candidate, he was elected member of Parliament in February 1876, but his election was invalidated and he was defeated in April 1876. Once again elected as a member of Parliament in October 1877, he was again invalidated and defeated in the ensuing by-election in 1878 He is mayor of Coëtlogon from 1884 to 1892.

Sources 
 

1838 births
1892 deaths
Politicians from Saint-Brieuc
Members of the 1st Chamber of Deputies of the French Third Republic
Members of the 2nd Chamber of Deputies of the French Third Republic
Mayors of places in Brittany
Veillette family